The Eldon Range is a mountain range located in the west coast region of Tasmania, Australia.

The range is located at the north eastern edge of Lake Burbury and is part of the Tasmanian Wilderness World Heritage Area which includes the Franklin-Gordon Wild Rivers National Park.

The range is east of the main line of the West Coast Range and runs at right angle to it in a west–east direction. It is separated from that range by the King River valley and is bordered by the Eldon River to the north and west.

Naming
It is claimed that Henry Hellyer named the present day Mount Farrell near Tullah with this same name in 1828 after Lord Eldon Lord Chancellor of England., however Charles Gould in 1869 gives this name to the range.

Peaks
Eldon Peak is a mountain that is the highest point on the range.

The similarly named Eldon Bluff is the eastern peak.

In the 1930s Eldon Peak was used as the starting point of a walk by F Smithies of Launceston and C Bradshaw of Linda. In 1991 Crawford and Reid's climb is found described in Crawfords book on the King.

Eldon Peak is one of the least visited peaks in Tasmania due to its remoteness.  It was climbed in 1947 by Keith Lancaster, a Tasmanian bushwalker who recorded a cairn on the summit, indicating it was not the first European ascent. Lancaster ascended from the King River valley, a route no longer possible due to the impoundment of the river.  Modern approaches would be from the south-east or south arriving at Lake Ewart at the foot of Eldon Bluff.  All approaches are over trackless terrain with patches of difficult scrub.

Part of the route from the south east follows the western border of the Cradle Mountain-Lake St Clair National Park, marked with poles by the bushman Charlie Spencer. Few of the poles still survive, and could not be relied upon. Navigation in this area would be extremely difficult in poor weather.

Gallery

See also

 List of highest mountains of Tasmania

References

Further reading
Charles Whitham Western Tasmania: A Land of Riches and Beauty

External links
 Tasmanian Wilderness World Heritage Area - Tasmania Parks and Wildlife Service

Mountain ranges of Tasmania
Western Tasmania
Eldon Peak